David Richard Courtney (born September 21, 1953) is an artist, writer, and political activist. He is best known for his writings on the South Asian hand drums known as the tabla. He made an unsuccessful bid for Texas State Senate under the Green Party of Texas in both the 2012 and 2014 race.

Artistic career
He began his study of the Indian tabla in 1972. In January 1975 he enrolled in the Ali Akbar College of Music in California where he initially studied tabla but then studied pakhawaj under Zakir Hussain. In 1976 he moved to Hyderabad India and began studying tabla and pakhawaj under the late Shaik Dawood Khan. He remained a student until Shaik Dawood Khan's death in 1992. It was also during this period that he studied santur under the late Hassan Mohamad, and dilruba under Sayed-ur-Rehman Jigar. Later he also studied sarangi under Aslam Khan of Hyderabad. Mr. Courtney has worked on numerous CD, vinyl disks, stage performances, as well as performance tours and workshops. From 2003 to 2010 he was a co-producer and presenter for KPFT's world music program "Music Beyond Borders" in Houston.

After 2000, he began to turn his attention to the genre of music videos. In this regard he won awards at the Worldfest: Houston International Film Festival.

Writer
David Courtney has over 60 publications spreading over the last 35 years. The majority of these works are on Indian music, computers, and musical technology.

Politics
His political activism began in 2001 when he became involved in the anti-war movement that was a reaction to the war in Iraq. During this period he was on the steering committee of the "Houston Coalition for Justice Not War". He was also involved in the "Tejas Block" that protested at the 2004 Republican National Convention in New York. During this period he also began to be involved in voter registration activities in minority communities.

It was in 2004 that he started to make the transition from street level political activism to partisan politics. This transition began when he became active in Dennis Kucinich's failed bid for the US Presidency. David remained active in the local Democratic Party until he switched to the Green Party in 2011. In  both 2012 and 2014 he filed his candidacy for the Texas State Senate for District 17. He was unsuccessful in both of these bids.  He also did a two year as the Treasurer of the Texas State Green Party.

Personal life
In 1976 he married the Indian vocalist Chandra Courtney. They have two children, a son and a daughter.

Partial list of publications
 1980 Introduction to Tabla. Hyderabad, India: Anand Power Press.
 1985 "Tabla Making in the Deccan". Percussive Notes. Vol 23 No 2: pp 33–34. Urbana: Percussive Arts Society.
 1987 "Tata and his Kamakshi Vina". Experimental Musical Instruments. December: pp 5–9. Nicasia, CA :EMI
 1988 "The Tabla Puddi". Experimental Musical Instruments. Vol 4 No 4: pp 12–16. Nicasio: EMI.
 1989 "An Indian Music Specific Audio Driver". Journal of the Acoustical Society of India. Vol 17 No. 3&4: 269 272. Calcutta: ASI.
 1991 "The Application of the C=64 to Indian Music: A Review", Syntax, June/July: pp. 8–9: Houston.
 1991 Tuning the Tabla: A Psychoacoustic Perspective. Percussive Notes. Vol 29 No 3: pp 59–61. Urbana: Percussive Arts Society.
 1992 New Approaches to Tabla Instruction. Percussive Notes. Vol 30 No 4: pp 27–29. Lawton OK: Percussive Arts Society.
 1992 "Introduction to Spectrum Analysis" Experimental Musical Instruments. Vol 8, No 1: pp 18–22. Nicasio, CA.
 1993 "Mrdangam et Tabla: un Contraste". Percussions: Cahier Bimensiel d'Études et d'Informations sur les Arts de la Percussion. Chailly-en-Biere, France: Vol 28, March/April * * * 1993; pp 11–14.
 1993 "An Introduction to Tabla". Modern Drummer. Mt. Morris, IL: October 1993; Vol 17, #10: pp. 38–84.
 1993 "Repair and Maintenance of Tabla", Percussive Notes, Lawton OK: October 1993; Vol.31, No 7: pp 29–36.
 1994 "The Cadenza in North Indian Tabla". Percussive Notes, Lawton OK: August 1994; Vol.32, No 4: pp 54–64.
 1995 "The Cyclic Form in North Indian Tabla", Percussive Notes, Lawton OK: August 1994; Vol.33, No 6: pp 32–45.
 1995 Fundamentals of Tabla. Houston TX: Sur Sangeet Services.
 2000 Advanced Theory of Tabla. Houston TX: Sur Sangeet Services.
 2001 Manufacture and Repair of Tabla. Houston TX: Sur Sangeet Services.
 2001 Learning the Tabla (Volume 1). Pacific MO: Mel Bay Publications.
 2003 Focus on the Kaidas of Tabla. Houston TX: Sur Sangeet Services.
 2009 Learning the Sitar. Pacific MO: Mel Bay Publications.
 2009 Learning the Tabla (Volume 2). Pacific MO: Mel Bay Publications.

Partial discography
 1977 Folk Songs of India (Anasuya - Seetha in USA)
 1981 Darshan Dena
 1982 Three Ragas
 1983 Live at the SYDA
 1984 Gazal-Hyderabad
 1985 Two Friends
 1986 Kavita o Kavita
 1988 Sangeet Sagar (Vol 1)
 1989 Sangeet Sagar (Vol 2)
 1989 Shraddha Suman
 1989 Theme music to Asiana (Weekly TV Program)
 1990 Jugal Bandhi
 1998 Amrit
 1998 Realm of Raga Rock
 2000 Bhairavi Bhairav
 2001 Live at the Stafford Civic Centre
 2003 Sri Lalitha Sahasranama
 2006 Devi Stotra Kadamba Mala

Partial filmography
 2005 Dancing in Twilight (contributed music)
 2010 Brindavani Sarang (director/music director)
 2011 Gayatri Mantra in Nava Raga (Rain)(director/music director)
 2011 Jaijaivanti Tarana (director/music director)

Major awards
 1996 - Award of Excellence from the American Telugu Association
 2009 - Cultural Jewel of India from the Indian Cultural Centre (Houston)
 2011 - Bronze "Remi" Award (Experimental film and Video) from Worldfest Houston (Houston International Film Festival)
 2012 - Gold "Remi" Award (World Music/Techno) from Worldfest Houston (Houston International Film Festival)
 2015 - Sunshine Awards.

References

1953 births
Living people
Artists from Houston
Activists from Houston
Texas Greens
Writers from Houston